The 1975–76 Rugby Union County Championship was the 76th edition of England's County Championship rugby union club competition.

Gloucestershire won their 13th title after defeating Middlesex in the final.

First round 

+ Lancashire won play off 13-3

Second round

Semi finals

Final

See also
 English rugby union system
 Rugby union in England

References

Rugby Union County Championship
County Championship (rugby union) seasons